Pseudobombur is an extinct genus of crustacean in the order Decapoda, containing the species Pseudobombur nummuliticus.

References

Penaeidae
Eocene crustaceans